Polypyridinium salts are members of a class of main chain polyelectrolytes.

References

Polyelectrolytes
Organic polymers